The Lie is a 1914 American silent short western drama film directed by Allan Dwan and featuring Murdock MacQuarrie, Pauline Bush, and Lon Chaney. The film is now considered lost. A still exists from the film showing Chaney as "Young MacGregor".

Plot
Auld MacGregor is a stern, religious old Scotsman who hoards his money while his son and daughter live in abject poverty. A gambler plots to rob MacGregor of his money, and he works up a friendship with MacGregor's son by giving him gambling winnings. Arthur, who dislikes the gambler, tells Auld MacGregor where his son got the money he's been spreading around, and the old man fights with his son. Young MacGregor gets in a saloon fight with the gambler, and both Arthur and MacGregor's daughter each fire a gun at the gambler simultaneously. Arthur's bullet kills the gambler, but since she is not aware that Arthur also fired a shot at the gambler, the girl believes it was her bullet that killed the man. MacGregor's son convinces his father to lie for the girl and provide an alibi for her, which goes against all his religious beliefs. The truth is later revealed, however, and Arthur is charged with the murder.

Cast
 Murdock MacQuarrie as Auld MacGregor
 Lon Chaney as MacGregor's son
 Pauline Bush as MacGregor's daughter
 James Neill as The Gambler
 William Lloyd as MacGregor's brother
 Richard Rosson as Youth #1
 Arthur Rosson as  Youth #2
 Fred McKay as Youth's Father

Reception
"Motion Picture World" stated: "This is a very good two-reel production....The story is interestingly presented and holds interest from the beginning.  It is perhaps a little drawn-out in places, but on the whole the film is a commendable one."

"Moving Picture World" stated: "It is a great play. There is a remarkable and unique situation...Allan Dawn (sic), one of the Universal top-notch directors, has produced this play. It is laid in the West, and if there is a place on the green earth that Mr. Dwan is familiar with, it is the West and its people. He has made every scene ring with realism."

References

External links

1914 films
1914 drama films
1914 short films
1914 lost films
Silent American drama films
American silent short films
American black-and-white films
Films directed by Allan Dwan
Lost American films
Lost drama films
Universal Pictures short films
1910s American films